William Magee Hunter (c.1834 – 7 November 1868) was a New Zealand soldier. He was born in County Antrim, Ireland on c.1834. He is remembered for leading the Pākehā forces against Titokowaru in the New Zealand Wars.

References

1830s births
1868 deaths
New Zealand military personnel
People from County Antrim
Irish emigrants to New Zealand (before 1923)
New Zealand people of Irish descent